Vaghela (also known as Baghel) is a Rajput clan that are descendants from the Vaghela dynasty of Gujarat, which was an offshoot of the Chaulukya (Solanki) dynasty, ruling Gujarat in the 13th century CE. They were the last Hindu and Rajput dynasty to rule Gujarat before the Muslim conquest of the region.

Early members of the Vaghela family served the Chaulukyas in the 12th century CE, and claimed to be a branch of that dynasty. In the 13th century, during the reign of the weak Chaulukya king Bhima II, the Vaghela general Lavanaprasada and his son Viradhavala gained a large amount of power in the kingdom, although they continued to nominally acknowledge Chaulukya suzerainty. In the mid-1240s, Viradhavala's son Visaladeva usurped the throne, and his successors ruled Gujarat until Karna Vaghela was defeated by Alauddin Khalji of the Delhi Sultanate in 1304 CE, and lost Gujarat.

See also 
 Vaghela dynasty
 Karan Ghelo, a historical novel about the reign of Karna II
 Rewa State
 Baghelkhand
 Pethapur State

References 

Rajput clans
Agnivansha
Vaghelas
Rajput clans of Gujarat
Rajput clans of Madhya Pradesh
Rajput clans of Rajasthan